Derrick Faison (August 24, 1967  June 27, 2004) is a former professional American football player who played wide receiver for one season for the Los Angeles Rams.

References

1967 births
2004 deaths
American football wide receivers
Los Angeles Rams players
Howard Bison football players